Kristi Lauren (born January 19, 1994) is an American actress. She co-starred as Sophie Watson on the Fox sitcom I Hate My Teenage Daughter.

Lauren began acting professionally in 2004 in the short film Save Virgil. In 2006, she had small role in the film Living the Dream starring Sean Young. In 2009, she co-starred in Melora Hardin's directorial debut film You. She also guest starred in the series Wizards of Waverly Place and Working Class in 2009 and 2011, respectively.

From 2011–12, she co-starred as Sophie Watson on the Fox sitcom I Hate My Teenage Daughter starring Jaime Pressly and Katie Finneran. The series was cancelled in 2012.

Lauren also guest starred in the television series Hawaii Five-0 as Amanda Harper in 2013 and had a small role in the opening sequence of the 2014 film Endless Love.

Filmography

References

External links

1994 births
Living people
21st-century American actresses
American child actresses
American film actresses
American television actresses
Place of birth missing (living people)